Athletics at the 2018 Summer Youth Olympics was held from 11 to 16 October. The events took place at the Parque Olímpico de la Juventud in Buenos Aires, Argentina.

For the first time, every athletics' event featured 2 stages – 2 separate competitions, both of their results were added together to conclude final standings.

Qualification
Each National Olympic Committee (NOC) can enter a maximum of 36 athletes, 18 per each gender and 1 per each event. In total, 680 (340 boys and 340 girls) athletes will compete at the Youth Olympics with continental qualification events deciding the majority of athletes. The distribution of quotas was decided based on the results from the 2015 World Youth Championships and 2017 World Youth Championships. As hosts, Argentina is given 4 quotas, 2 per each gender and universality places will be given to nations whom did not qualify an athlete with a maximum of 1 boy or girl per nation. These quotas will be subtracted from that nation's continental quota in the relevant event. All athletes qualified in the 1500 m, 3000 m and 2000 m steeplechase will compete their Stage 2 event in the cross country run.

To be eligible to participate at the Youth Olympics athletes must have been born between 1 January 2001 and 31 December 2002.

Qualification timeline

The Americas Youth Olympic trials were scheduled to be held in Nicaragua but were cancelled due to civil unrest in the country. Rankings will determine who competes from the continent.

Quota distribution
Boys

Girls

Schedule
The schedule was released by the Buenos Aires Youth Olympic Games Organizing Committee.

Medal summary

Medal table

Boys' events

Girls' events

Participating nations
A total of 177 countries entered athletes.

References

External links
Official Results Book – Athletics
Results at iaaf.com

 
2018
2018 Summer Youth Olympics events
Youth Summer Olympics
2018 Youth Olympics